Reanimation may refer to:
 Reanimation (facial surgery)
 Reanimation (science fiction), reanimation of the dead, as in Frankenstein
 Reanimated collabs, a type of collaborative fan-made animation project 
 Reanimation (Linkin Park album), 2002
 Reanimation (Lights & Motion album), 2013
 Reanimatsioon, or Reanimation, a 1995 album by Singer Vinger
 Night of the Living Dead 3D: Re-Animation, a 2012 horror film prequel to the 2006 film, Night of the Living Dead 3D

See also
 Reanimator (disambiguation)
 Re-Animated, a 2006 live-action/animated TV movie
 Cardiopulmonary resuscitation (CPR)
 Advanced life support
 Reanimation after nerve damage
 Resurrection (disambiguation)